In Papua New Guinea, the academic grading system scales from A (or First Class Honors) to D (or a Fail).

References 

Papua New Guinea
Education in Papua New Guinea
Academia in Papua New Guinea